Lev Lvovich Kobylinsky  (born on 2 August 1879, Moscow, Russian Empire - 17 November 1947, Locarno, Switzerland) was a poet, translator, theorist of symbolism, the Christian philosopher and historian of literature. His pseudonym was Ellis.

Biography

Lev Kobylinsky was born in Moscow. He was an illegitimate son of the director of private gymnasium Lev Polivanoff. In 1902 he graduated from the law faculty of Moscow University. Together with Andrei Bely organized poetic circle of " Argonauts ". In the years 1904–1909 an active member of the magazine Libra. In the years 1910–1917, along with Andrew White and Emily Medtner founded the publishing house "Musaget". He emigrated to Switzerland in 1911. Like his friend Andrei Bely, became interested in anthroposophy of Rudolf Steiner, but later he accepted Catholicism and joined the Society of Jesus. Ellis wrote literary and philosophical works in German. He died in Locarno, Switzerland.

Alignment

Christian worldview Ellis Kobylinsky was not orthodox.

Ellis defended the idea of reincarnation in his view the multiplicity of personalities - the result of the sinfulness of human nature. He considered the highest form of art symbolism and was a supporter of the aristocratic individualism and fan of Friedrich Nietzsche. His intuition considered as the essence of the symbolic contemplation, contemplation logically distinguishing purely intellectual, artistic and mystical.

Creativity

Ellis's poems "written under the influence of Soloviev, Bryusov, Bely and Balmont, according to the religious understanding of the world and the quest that come from the children's proximity to supermaterial world, that of religion permeated the life of the Middle Ages".

Criticism
"Immorteli." In 2 vols., 1904
"Russian Symbolists', 1910
«Vigilemus», 1914
Collections of poetry
«Stigmata», 1911
"Argo: Two books of poetry and the poem", 1914
Philosophical writings
Platon und Solowjew, Mainz, 1926
Christliche Weisheit, Basel, 1929 ("Christian wisdom")
WA Joukowski, Paderborn, 1933
Alexander Puschkin, der religiose Genius Russlands, Ölten, 1948
"The Kingdom of Saint Peter"

Publications

 Ellis. Poems. Tomsk: Aquarius, 1996.
 Ellis. Russian Symbolists. Tomsk: Aquarius, 1996. - 288.
 Ellis. Unpublished and Uncollected. Tomsk: Aquarius, 2000. - 460.
 Baudelaire "Flowers of Evil" and the prose poem in translation Ellis. Tomsk: Aquarius, 1993. - 400 s.

References
Nefed'ev GV Russian symbolism, from spiritualism to anthroposophy. Two documents to the biography of Ellis / / New Literary Review. Number 39. 1999. - P.119-140.
Kudryavtseva EL "I - XIII century man ...": the biography of Ellis / / HIDDEN Literature: Research and materials. Ivanovo, Vol. 2. S. 281-288.
Renata von Maydell. "hasten quietly": the history of the occult interests Ellis / / New Literary Review. Number 51. 2001. - P.214-239.
Wolfgang Kasack Lexicon Russian Literature of the 20th Century = Lexikon der russischen Literatur ab 1917. - M .: RIC "Culture", 1996. - 492. - 5000 copies.  -  - S. 482.

External links
http://www.poesis.ru/poeti-poezia/ellis/biograph.htm
https://web.archive.org/web/20130920112423/http://www.silverage.ru/poets/ellis_bio.html
http://istina.rin.ru/philosofy/text/4376.html

Converts to Roman Catholicism from atheism or agnosticism
Jesuits from the Russian Empire
Poets from the Russian Empire
Translators from the Russian Empire
Catholic philosophers
Historians from the Russian Empire
Literary historians
1879 births
1947 deaths
Soviet emigrants to Switzerland
Writers from Moscow
20th-century Russian translators
20th-century Russian male writers
20th-century pseudonymous writers